John Parker (13 March 1936 – 7 October 2018) was an Australian cricketer. He played thirty first-class matches for Western Australia between 1960/61 and 1964/65.

References

External links
 

1936 births
2018 deaths
Australian cricketers
Western Australia cricketers
Cricketers from Perth, Western Australia